The Promise is a studio album by American singer-songwriter Bruce Springsteen, released November 16, 2010, on Columbia Records. The album is a collection of previously unreleased songs which were recorded during the Darkness on the Edge of Town sessions in 1977–1978, with some vocals and additional instrumentation overdubs recorded in 2010. It was released in 2CD and 3LP formats. The album is also available as part of the box set The Promise: The Darkness on the Edge of Town Story. The two-CD version of the release entered the UK Albums Chart at number 7. It had been in production for many years and was originally scheduled to be released for the 30th anniversary in 2008.  The Promise debuted at #16 on the Billboard 200, while the box set, The Promise: The Darkness on the Edge of Town Story, debuted at #27.

The album features one of the last appearances of Clarence Clemons before his death in June 2011. Clemons is featured on the song "Save My Love", which was the only song on the album completely re-recorded by Springsteen and the E Street Band for the project.

Promotion
On November 16, 2010, Springsteen performed "Because the Night" and "Save My Love" with Steven Van Zandt, Roy Bittan and the Roots on Late Night with Jimmy Fallon (along with a cover of Willow Smith's "Whip My Hair" with Fallon posing as Neil Young). Songs from the album were performed during Springsteen's Wrecking Ball Tour in 2012–2013.

Critical reception

Upon its release, The Promise received acclaim from most music critics. At Metacritic, which assigns a normalized rating out of 100 to reviews from mainstream critics, the album received an average score of 94, based on 17 reviews, which indicates "universal acclaim".

Allmusic gave it four and a half stars; they stated that, "The Promise stands on its own as a great Bruce Springsteen record; it feels finished, focused, and, above all, offers more proof that Springsteen is one of the greatest rock and pop songwriters" although stating that "The Promise" was the only track that might have added something to the original Darkness on the Edge of Town album. BBC Music had a favorable review and stated "The Promise is as compelling an advert for the Boss’s beautiful, blue-collar soul as you’re likely to find outside of the hits; an indispensable portrait of an artist at the top of his game."

Commercial performance
The Promise debuted at #16 on the Billboard 200. While not selling as well as his previous studio albums on the American charts, the set did well on the European charts (with first week worldwide sales of over 187,000 units), opening at No. 1 in Germany, Spain, and Norway. It also charted at No. 4 in The Netherlands, Denmark and Ireland, No. 5 in Austria, No. 7 in the United Kingdom and No. 9 in Switzerland.

Track listing
All songs written by Bruce Springsteen, except where noted.

Personnel
Adapted from the album's liner notes:

 Bruce Springsteen – lead vocals, guitars, harmonica
 Roy Bittan – piano
 Clarence Clemons – saxophone, percussion
 Danny Federici – organ, glockenspiel
 Garry Tallent – bass guitar
 Steve Van Zandt – guitar, harmony vocals, horn arrangement
 Max Weinberg – drums
Bob Chirmside - bass on "It's a Shame"
Jon Landau - drums on "It's a Shame"
Barry Danielian - trumpet on "The Brokenhearted", "It's a Shame" and "Breakaway"
Curt Ramm - trumpet on "The Brokenhearted", "It's a Shame" and "Breakaway"
Rick Gazda - trumpet on "Talk to Me"
Bob Muckin - trumpet on "Talk to Me"
Stan Harrison - tenor saxophone on "The Brokenhearted", "It's a Shame", "Talk to Me" and "Breakaway"
Ed Manion - baritone saxophone on "The Brokenhearted", "It's a Shame", "Talk to Me" and "Breakaway"
Dan Levine - trombone on "The Brokenhearted", "It's a Shame" and "Breakaway"
Richie "La Bamba" Rosenberg - trombone on "Talk to Me"
David Lindley - violin on "Racing in the Street ('78)", "Come On (Let's Go Tonight)"
Tiffeny Andrews  – backing vocals on "Someday (We'll Be Together)" and "Breakaway"
Corinda Carford – backing vocals on "Someday (We'll Be Together)" and "Breakaway"
Michelle Moore – backing vocals on "Someday (We'll Be Together)" and "Breakaway"
Antionette Savage – backing vocals on "Someday (We'll Be Together)" and "Breakaway"
Patti Scialfa – backing vocals on "Someday (We'll Be Together)" and "Breakaway"
Soozie Tyrell – backing vocals on "Someday (We'll Be Together)" and "Breakaway"

Technical

 Jon Landau, Bruce Springsteen – original tracks production
 Bruce Springsteen – additional production
 Jimmy Iovine, Toby Scott – recording
 Thom Panunzio, Rob Lebret – assistant engineers
 Bob Clearmountain – mixing
 Brandon Duncan – mixing assistant
 Bob Ludwig – mastering
 Ken Asher – string arrangement on "The Promise"
 Toby Scott – recording project supervisor
 Rob Lebret, Kevin Buell – assistants
 Kevin Buell – guitars support staff
 Harry McCarthy – drums support staff
 Shari Sutcliffe – musician contracts
 Toby Scott, Matt Kelly, Donna Kloepfer, Sean Brennan, Tim Sturgis – archive research, retrieval and restoration
 Eric Meola – photography
 Michelle Holme, Dave Bett – art direction

Charts

Weekly charts

Year-end charts

Certifications

References

Bruce Springsteen compilation albums
2010 compilation albums
Albums produced by Jon Landau
Columbia Records compilation albums